William Povey (born 11 January 1943), also known as Bill Povey, is an English former professional footballer who played as a winger in the Football League for York City, and was on the books of Middlesbrough made 6 league appearances.

References

1943 births
Living people
People from Billingham
Footballers from County Durham
English footballers
Association football wingers
Middlesbrough F.C. players
York City F.C. players
English Football League players